Trenčín Airfield  serves Trenčín, a city in the Trenčín Region of Slovakia.

Airlines and Destinations
As of February 2022, there are no scheduled passenger services to/from Trenčín Airfield.

Festival Pohoda 
Since 2004, Trenčín Airfield has been the site of the Pohoda music and culture festival.

References

External links

Airports in Slovakia
Buildings and structures in Trenčín